The 1988 Supercopa de España was two-leg Spanish football matches played on 21 September and 29 September 1988. It contested by Barcelona, who were Spanish Cup winners in 1987–88, and Real Madrid, who won the 1987–88 Spanish League. Real Madrid won 3–2 on aggregate.

Match details

First leg

Second leg

See also
El Clásico

References
 List of Super Cup Finals 1988 RSSSF.com
  linguasport.com

Supercopa de Espana Final
Supercopa de España
Supercopa de Espana 1988
Supercopa de Espana 1988
Supercopa de España